The Cloverdale Cash Spiel was an annual bonspiel, or curling tournament on the men's and women's World Curling Tour, that took place at the Cloverdale Curling Club in Cloverdale, British Columbia (in Surrey). The tournament was held in a round-robin format. The tournament was established in 2011 as one of the first events of the season, and was last held in 2016. The event counted toward the Canadian Team Ranking System, which hands out points based on performances at CTRS events and deals with qualification to the Canadian Olympic Curling Trials.

Past champions

Men

Women

References

Former World Curling Tour events
Sport in Surrey, British Columbia
Curling in British Columbia
Women's World Curling Tour events
Recurring sporting events established in 2011
2011 establishments in British Columbia